The 1934 Oglethorpe Stormy Petrels football team was an American football team that represented Oglethorpe University as an independent during the 1934 college football season. In their first year under head coach John W. Patrick, the Stormy Petrels compiled a 5–4–1 record.

Schedule

References

Oglethorpe
Oglethorpe Stormy Petrels football seasons
Oglethorpe Stormy Petrels football